The National Railroad Museum  is a railroad museum located in Ashwaubenon, Wisconsin, US.

Founded in 1956 by community volunteers, the National Railroad Museum is one of the oldest and largest U.S. institutions dedicated to preserving and interpreting the nation's railroad history. Two years later, a joint resolution of Congress recognized the Museum as the National Railroad Museum. The museum has been a Nonprofit 501(c)(3) organization since 1958.

Its collection of locomotives and rolling stock spans more than a century of railroading. Notable items include an Aerotrain; Union Pacific Big Boy No. 4017, one of the world's largest steam locomotives; and British Railways Class A4 No. 60008 Dwight D Eisenhower (ex-London & North Eastern Railway No. 4496 Golden Shuttle) and train used by the Supreme Allied Commander and his staff in the United Kingdom and continental Europe during World War II.

A museum building houses a wide variety of railroad artifacts, an archive, and photography gallery. A standard gauge track rings the grounds. An  wooden observation tower has views of the Fox River and Green Bay. 

The museum hosts an annual Day Out with Thomas event, where Thomas the Tank Engine pulls young friends past the exhibited rolling stock; and in October,  "Terror on the Fox": Green Bay Preble Optimist Club's haunted attraction that includes "haunted" train rides after dark. The Frederick J. Lenfesty Center, an enclosed and climate-controlled structure was recently added that houses several of the unique and rarer locomotives and cars.

Rolling stock

Steam locomotives

Diesel locomotives

Electric locomotives

Passenger cars

Freight cars

Maintenance of way cars

Cabooses

Other equipment

Other collections
The museum's archives hold corporate records and documents, annual reports, maps, mechanical and engineering drawings, oral histories, and ephemera. The holdings represent various railroad companies, labor unions, and fraternal organizations.

Its library holds works on the social, economic, political, and cultural aspects of U.S. railroading history.

The National Railroad Museum holds over 5,000 artifacts, including textiles, uniforms, tools and personal items.

Its photograph collection includes 15,000 photographic prints, slides, and film negatives of U.S. railroading since 1890.

Capital campaign
As of 2019, the museum was working to raise money to build a roundhouse to surround its current buildings (except the train station) to shelter from the weather the locomotives and cars displayed in the open pavilion.

See also
List of heritage railroads in the United States

References

Railroad museums in Wisconsin
National railway museums
Culture of Green Bay, Wisconsin
Museums in Brown County, Wisconsin
Haunted attractions (simulated)
1956 establishments in Wisconsin